Ramesh Singh Kushwaha  (born 25 January 1962) is an Indian politician. He is former member Of Bihar Legislative Assembly from 106th Ziradei constituency in Siwan district.

Early life 
He was born in middle class family. His father  Sitaram Singh Kushwaha was also a politician while mother Sarla Devi is a housewife. His father was  a leader of CPI(ML) where his grand father Ramjash Mahto was a socialist. His grand mother Vimla Devi was also into politics.

Political career 
Kushwaha began his political career in the Communist Party of India (Marxist–Leninist) Liberation. Following the murder of student activist Chandrashekhar Prasad, he filed the FIR against the sitting member of parliament, Mohammad Shahabuddin. He however failed to appear in court to record his statement against the member of parliament. His party members stated that he was pressurised by Shahabuddin and had succumbed to the pressure. In 2000, he expelled from the party for "anti-party" activities.

He joined the Rashtriya Janata Dal after being expelled and worked there till 2003. He became a member of the Rashtriya Lok Samta Party afterwards and then later joined the Janata Dal (United). In 2015, he won the seat of the Ziradei constituency as a candidate of the Janata Dal (United) backed by the Rashtriya Janata Dal. He had contested against his former associate Amarjeet Kushwaha of the Communist Party of India (Marxist–Leninist) Liberation and the sitting member Asha Devi of the Bharatiya Janata Party. In 2020 Bihar Assembly Election Janata Dal (United) denied the ticket to Kushwaha though he was winner in the last election from Ziradei seat on party ticket.

Convictions
He is prime accused in the murder of Shivji Dubey while he was associated with CPI (ML). In December 2018 chief judicial magistrate of Siwan district summoned him in the 18 year old murder case after he won the 2015 Assembly Election. He surrendered and was sent for 14 day judicial custody.

See also

Ziradei
Ziradei (Vidhan Sabha constituency)
2015 Bihar Legislative Assembly election

References

External links
हाईकोर्ट का आदेश, जदयू विधायक रमेश कुशवाहा पर चलेगा हत्या का मामला

Living people
Janata Dal (United) politicians
1962 births